Kebun Bunga is a state constituency in Penang, Malaysia, that has been represented in the Penang State Legislative Assembly since 1986. It covers the Penang Botanic Gardens, after which it is named, as well as parts of George Town's western suburbs - Tanjung Tokong and Air Itam.

The state constituency was first contested in 1986 and is mandated to return a single Assemblyman to the Penang State Legislative Assembly under the first-past-the-post voting system. , the State Assemblyman for Kebun Bunga is Ong Khan Lee from Parti Keadilan Rakyat (PKR), which is part of the state's ruling coalition, Pakatan Harapan (PH).

Definition

Polling districts 
According to the federal gazette issued on 30 March 2018, the Kebun Bunga constituency is divided into 8 polling districts.

Fettes Park and Ladang Hong Seng are situated at Tanjung Tokong, while Rumah Pangsa, Rifle Range Road and Rifle Range refer to the suburban neighbourhood of Rifle Range at the northern fringes of Air Itam. The western portion of Tanjung Tokong that falls under this constituency, including the neighbourhood of Mount Erskine, is bounded to the east by Jalan Gajah, Tanjung Tokong Road, Fettes Road and Mount Erskine Road.

Demographics

History

Election results 
The electoral results for the Kebun Bunga state constituency in 2008, 2013 and 2018 are as follows.

See also 
 Constituencies of Penang

References 
 

Penang state constituencies